

Incumbents
President: Edgar Lungu

Events
March 18 - First case of the COVID-19 pandemic in Zambia
March 22 - A third case was recorded. The patient was a man who had travelled to Pakistan.
March 25 - President Edgar Lungu confirmed a total of 12 cases during a live national address.
April 2 - Zambia records its first death from COVID-19.
September 8 – President Lungu joins students at Copperbelt University (CBU) in mourning the death of "Mafishi," a large fish thought to bring students good luck.
November 13 – Finance Minister Bwalya Ng’andu says that Zambia is defaulting on its debt.

Deaths
August 16 – Alexander Grey Zulu, 95, Zambian politician, Minister of Commerce and Industry  (1964) and Defence (1970–1973).

See also

COVID-19 pandemic in Zambia
COVID-19 pandemic in Africa
2020 in East Africa
2020 in Angola
2020 in Botswana
2020 in Namibia
2020 in Zimbabwe

References

 
2020s in Zambia
Years of the 21st century in Zambia
Zambia